Ypsilandra is a genus of at least six herbaceous plant species, first described as a genus in 1888. This genus is a member of the Melanthiaceae and is native to East Asia (China, the Himalayas, Myanmar, Thailand).

Ypsilandra species are perennial plants that grow from thick rhizomes.  They are associated with sloping, forested habitats.  They are very infrequently cultivated in the West. Their leaves are generally long and thin, growing in a rosette from the base of the plant.  Ypsilandra species produce flowers on a long scape arising from the intersection of the leaves and the stem.  The inflorescences consist of a cluster of nodding, radially-symmetrical tube-shaped flowers with six tepals.  The stamens protrude beyond the tepals.  Depending on the species, the tepals may be white, pink, purple, or yellow.

 Species
 Ypsilandra alpina F.T.Wang & Tang - Tibet, Yunnan, N Myanmar
 Ypsilandra cavaleriei H.Lév. & Vaniot - Guangdong, Guangxi, Guizhou, Hunan
 Ypsilandra jinpingensis W.H.Chen, Y.M.Shui & ZhiY.Yu - Yunnan, N Vietnam
 Ypsilandra kansuensis R.N.Zhao & Z.X.Peng - Gansu
 Ypsilandra thibetica Franch. - Sichuan, Hunan, Guangxi, Taiwan
 Ypsilandra yunnanensis W.W.Sm. & Jeffrey - Nepal, Yunnan, Bhutan, Assam, Myanmar

Ypsilandra thibetica is used in traditional Chinese medicine, especially in Sichuan and Yunnan provinces, as a
haemostatic.

Gallery

References

External links
 Flora of China treatment: Ypsilandra

Melanthiaceae
Flora of East Himalaya
Flora of Indo-China
Flora of China
Melanthiaceae genera